K Project may refer to:

 Soviet Project K nuclear tests
 K (TV series), a 2012 animated series also known as K Project
 Rez, a 2001 video game which had a working title K-Project
 Project K, a Burmese boy band
 Kurohyō: Ryū ga Gotoku Shinshō, a video game codenamed Project K